Saint-Célestin is a municipality in Quebec, in the Nicolet-Yamaska Regional County Municipality of the Centre-du-Québec region.

The village of Saint-Célestin is an enclave within it.

Demographics

Population
Population trend:

See also
List of municipalities in Quebec

References

Municipalities in Quebec
Incorporated places in Centre-du-Québec
Nicolet-Yamaska Regional County Municipality